Citizen TV is a Kenyan free-to-air news television channel owned by Royal Media Services and broadcasting mostly in English and Swahili. It was started in 1999 and relaunched in June 2006.

News and programs
Citizen TV airs a variety of genres of entertainment programs ranging from local and international. It airs a wide variety of soap operas and has an acceptable amount of local content and News.

Presenters 
Waihiga Mwaura
Yvone Okwara Matole
Jeff Koinange[JKLIVE] 
Victoria Rubadiri
Trevor Ombija
Lilian Muli
Swaleh Mdoe
Mwanahamisi Hamadi
Nimrod Taabu
Mashirima Kapombe[longalonga]
Jamila Mohamed
Lulu Hassan
Rashid Abdala

Shows 
 Inspekta Mwala
 Tahidi High
 Zora
Maria
 Papa Shirandula
 Machachari
 10/10 Show
Skool flix
 Wedding Show
 Deceptive measures
 Jirani show
Blood ties
Rebecca
My better world
Ringo
Laws of love
Sultana
 One Love Show
Te doy la vida (Mexican TV series)
Carrossel
Cúmplices de um Resgate
The Wild Soccer Bunch(animation)
Mother in law
Waking Up With You
La Reina Soy So
 Kubamba show

History
On 22 July 2018, Citizen TV unveiled their new television studio and star news anchors. These included Lulu Hassan and Rashid Abdalla, the first married couple to present the news on Kenyan television. The station also launched an affiliate Ramogi TV in 2021.

Awards
 Communications Authority KUZA Awards, 2021 
 Couture Africa Style Awards, 2021

References 

Television stations in Kenya
Television channels and stations established in 1999
Multilingual broadcasters
Television channels and stations established in 2006
1999 establishments in Kenya